Cream of the crop may refer to:
 Cream of the Crop, the 1969 album recorded by Diana Ross & the Supremes
 Cream of the Crop (Wanda Jackson album), a 1968 album by Wanda Jackson
 Cream of the Crop (Dead Milkmen album), a 1998 compilation album by The Dead Milkmen
 Crème de la crème (disambiguation)